Radau is a river in Lower Saxony, Germany.

Radau may also refer to:

 Rodolphe Radau (1835–1911), German astronomer and mathematician
 Radau (crater), impact crater on Mars
 Radawie (German Radau), a village in southwestern Poland
 "Radau", a song by God Is an Astronaut on the album Far from Refuge